The men's competition in the light-heavyweight (– 85 kg) division was held on 10–11 November 2011.

Schedule

Medalists

Records

 Andrei Rybakou's world record was rescinded in 2016.

Results

References

(Pages 46, 49 & 51) Start List 
2011 IWF World Championships Results Book Pages 41–43 
Results

2011 World Weightlifting Championships